The 2012 San Jose Earthquakes season is the club's 15th year of existence, as well as its 15th season in Major League Soccer and its fifth consecutive season in the top-flight of American soccer. Including all previous franchises, this is the 30th year with a soccer club in the San Jose area sporting the name "Earthquakes".

Squad
As of September 14, 2012.

Reserve
This list shows players who have played for the team in official 2011 MLS Reserve Division games, but are not part of the senior roster.

Management

Other information

Transfers

In

Out

Loans in

Loans out

Friendlies

Timbers Tournament

Competitions

Major League Soccer

Regular season

League table

Conference

Overall

Results by round

Results

MLS Cup Playoffs

U.S. Open Cup

Miscellany

Allocation ranking 
San Jose is in the #6 position in the MLS Allocation Ranking. The allocation ranking is the mechanism used to determine which MLS club has first priority to acquire a U.S. National Team player who signs with MLS after playing abroad, or a former MLS player who returns to the league after having gone to a club abroad for a transfer fee. A ranking can be traded, provided that part of the compensation received in return is another club's ranking.

International roster slots 
San Jose has 7 MLS International Roster Slots for use in the 2012 season. Each club in Major League Soccer is allocated 8 international roster spots. San Jose traded one slot to Toronto in July 2011 and acquired one slot from Sporting Kansas City in December 2011. Each of these trades expire on January 1, 2013. Also, San Jose had previously traded a slot to Toronto in July 2008 that returns on January 1, 2014.

Future draft pick trades 
Future picks acquired: None.
Future picks traded: 2013 MLS SuperDraft conditional pick to New York Red Bulls.

MLS Rights to Other Players 
San Jose maintains the MLS rights to Clarence Goodson after he declined a contract offer by the league and signed overseas with no transfer fee received. San Jose acquired Goodson's rights by drafting him in the 2007 MLS Expansion Draft.

References 

San Jose Earthquakes seasons
San Jose Earthquakes
San Jose Earthquakes
San Jose Earthquakes
2012